E-Ville Roller Derby is a women's flat track roller derby league based in Edmonton, Alberta, Canada.  Founded in 2006, E-Ville is a member of the Women's Flat Track Derby Association (WFTDA).

History and organization
E-Ville Roller Derby was founded in 2006 by Laura "Chasey Maim" Holochuk along with six other women. By January 2010, the league had more than fifty skaters, and claimed to be the largest roller derby league in northern Alberta. E-Ville launched the first junior roller derby league in Canada.

In 2013, E-Ville hosted what was billed as "Canada's first roller derby championships" at the West Edmonton Mall, in which they finished in third place. During 2014, E-Ville Roller Derby moved to Edmonton Sportsdome due to the demolition of Mayfield Trade Center. The league celebrated its tenth anniversary in 2016.

League skater Hell'on Keller was selected to play for Team Canada at the 2011 Roller Derby World Cup.

Teams
E-Ville currently features a three team house league, comprising the Berzerkhers, Las Pistolitas and Slice Girls, and two travel teams which compete against teams from other leagues, the E-Ville Dead WFTDA-charter team, and the Living Dead B team. The house league teams compete for an annual championship called the Gage Cup, named for the late son of a former league member. The Berzerkhers won the title in 2013, Las Pistolitas in 2016, the Slice Girls in 2010, 2011, 2014 and 2015, and former home team the Black Gold Diggers won the title in 2009 and 2012.

WFTDA competition
E-Ville joined the WFTDA Apprentice Program in January 2015, and became a full member in March 2016. E-Ville made their WFTDA Playoffs debut in 2017 at the Division 2 Playoffs and Championships as the 15th seed, and finished in eighth place after a 295–238 loss to Oklahoma Victory Dolls.

WFTDA rankings

References

Roller derby leagues established in 2006
Roller derby leagues in Canada
Sports teams in Edmonton
Women's Flat Track Derby Association Division 2
2006 establishments in Alberta